Pipesville is an unincorporated community in Knox County, in the U.S. state of Ohio.

History
A post office called Pipesville was established in 1872, and remained in operation until 1902. The community was named for Warren Pipes, first postmaster.

References

Unincorporated communities in Knox County, Ohio
1872 establishments in Ohio
Unincorporated communities in Ohio